Sutton School is a coeducational foundation special school, located in the Russells Hall Estate in Dudley, West Midlands, England.

It provides education to pupils aged 11 to 16 years and caters for approximately 160 pupils. Pupils at the school have a Statement of Special Educational Needs, and are deemed to have moderate learning difficulties.

The current school buildings were constructed in 1962 and the school underwent a significant expansion in 1997. An ICT suite was constructed in 2013. The school has also gained specialist status as a Business and Enterprise College.

References

External links
Sutton School official website

Special schools in the Metropolitan Borough of Dudley
Foundation schools in the Metropolitan Borough of Dudley
Special secondary schools in England